Shackleford is a village in England.

Shackleford may also refer to:

Shackleford, Missouri, a community in the United States
Shackleford (horse) (born 2008), 2011 Preakness Stakes winner

Surname
Charles Shackleford, (1966–2017), American basketball player
Dorsey W. Shackleford, (1853–1936), American politician
Michael Shackleford, (born 1965), American mathematician
Lynn Shackleford (born 1947), American basketball player and sports broadcaster
Ken Shackleford, (born 1985), National Football League player
Rusty Shackleford, alias of Dale Gribble from King of the Hill

Other
Shackleford Act
Shackleford Banks
Shackleford pony, also known as the Banker horse.

See also
Shackelford (disambiguation)
Shacklefords (disambiguation)